Stylidium subg. Forsteropsis, as circumscribed by Allen Lowrie and Kevin Kenneally, contains five species of triggerplants from south-western Australia that are characterized by their tightly appressed leaves arranged in a spiral around the stem. This subgenus was originally described by Otto Wilhelm Sonder in 1845 as the genus Forsteropsis.

See also
List of Stylidium species

References

Stylidium
Plant subgenera